Panchaksharam Rangasamy Pillai (born 29 August 1943), known professionally as Vijayakumar, is an Indian actor who works in Tamil cinema. He started his film career in the Tamil film Sri Valli (1961) as a child actor and started playing a lead role from the movie Aval Oru Thodar Kathai (1974) then he worked in Madhura Geetham (1977) and Azhage Unnai Aarathikkiren (1979). He has also acted in Telugu and  Malayalam movies. He also worked in television serials like Thangam, Vamsam,  Talambralu, Nandini and Rasaathi. His son is actor Arun Vijay.

Early life
Vijayakumar was born on 29 August 1943 in Nattuchalai, Pattukkottai Taluk, Thanjavur dist, Tamil Nadu, India. His birth name Panchaksharam was changed to Vijayakumar for films. He debuted in the 1961 Tamil movie Sri Valli. Again in 1964, with the help of his uncle, he came to Chennai and tried for roles, but only got a small role in the movie Kandhan Karunai as one of the devargal, arrested by the Asura king, Surapadma. Later in 1973, he got an offer to act in films. His first major role was in Kailasam Balachander's Aval Oru Thodar Kathai in 1974.

Professional career
His journey in filmdom began as a child actor in the film Sri Valli in 1961. Vijayakumar was the little Lord Murugan in Sri Valli, starring Sivaji Ganesan and Padmini. Though not many offers were forthcoming for the little actor, he was supposed to play Lord Murugan in Kandhan Karunai (1967), but instead Sivakumar played that role. Vijayakumar acted in a small role as one of the Lords that was arrested by Surapadman. In 1973, Vijayakumar got his first break in Ponnukku Thanga Manasu, directed by Devaraj–Mohan. The other hero in the film was Sivakumar. The success of Ponnuku Thanga Manasu got him a permanent place in Tamil cinema. Vijayakumar was a popular actor the seventies, who acted alongside leading actors such as Sivaji Ganesan in Dheepam (1977), with M. G. Ramachandran in Indru Pol Endrum Vaazhga (1977) and Kamal Haasan in Neeya? (1979). While Vijayakumar was a popular supporting actor, he did play the lead role during the 1970s, in films such as Aval Oru Thodar Kathai (1974), Madhura Geetham (1977) and Azhage Unnai Aarathikkiren (1979).

Vijayakumar continued to act in supporting roles in the early 1980s. After a brief slump, Vijayakumar's second innings came in 1988 with Mani Ratnam's Agni Natchathiram (1988), where he played Prabhu and Karthik's father. The movie told the story of two half brothers who fight for their father's love and property. During the 1990s, Vijayakumar was frequently seen in father roles such as Nattamai (1994) and Baashha (1995). During the same time, Vijayakumar also played lead roles in award-winning films such as Kizhakku Cheemayile (1993) and Anthimanthaarai (1996), with Bharathiraaja. The latter took him close to winning the National Film Award for Best Actor, eventually missing it by one vote. Vijayakumar continued to play senior roles during the 2000s; eventually the actor was seen in more grandfather roles. In the last few years, the actor has reduced his film commitments and focused on television serials. Vijayakumar has acted in over 400 films, primarily in Tamil, but also had brief stints in Telugu cinema.

Personal life
Vijayakumar's family consists of wives  Muthukannu and Manjula, daughters Kavitha and Anitha and son Arun Vijay from his first wife and daughters Vanitha, Preetha and Sridevi from his second wife. So far, Arun and his father have appeared together on screen five times – in ‘’Pandavar Bhoomi’’, Malai Malai, Maanja Velu’’, ‘Kuttram 23’’ and ‘Oh My Dog’.

He was the vice-president of South Indian Nadigar Sangam until 18 October 2015. He was also a member of the All India Anna Dravida Munnetra Kazhagam. On 16 March 2016, Vijayakumar joined the BJP in the presence of Union minister of state for road transport highways and shipping. Sri Pon Radhakrishnan said he would campaign for the party for this Assembly election.

On 23 July 2013, Vijayakumar's second wife Manjula died in Chennai. She was 59.

Filmography

 Television 

Awards

Tamil Nadu State Film Awards

 1993 – Tamil Nadu State Film Award Special Prize – Kizhakku Cheemayile 1996 – Tamil Nadu State Film Award Special Prize – Anthimanthaarai''

References

External links
 

Tamil male actors
Male actors from Tamil Nadu
Living people
Male actors in Tamil cinema
Tamil Nadu State Film Awards winners
1943 births
Indian male television actors
People from Thanjavur district
Male actors in Telugu cinema